Fengyan may refer to:

Fengyan, Guizhou, a town in Fenggang County, Guizhou, China
Fengyan Township, in Chongqing, China

See also
Feng Yan (disambiguation)